The 2007 Finlandia Trophy is an annual senior-level international figure skating competition held in Finland. It was held in Vantaa on October 12–14, 2007. Skaters competed in the disciplines of men's singles, ladies' singles, and pair skating. It was one of the competitions that helped choose the Finnish team for the 2008 European Figure Skating Championships.

Results

Men

Ladies

Pairs

External links
 2007 Finlandia Trophy results

Finlandia Trophy
Finlandia Trophy, 2007
Finlandia Trophy, 2007